The Bishop's ‘ō‘ō or Molokai ‘ō‘ō (Moho bishopi) was the penultimate member of the extinct genus of the ‘ō‘ōs (Moho) within the extinct family Mohoidae. It was previously regarded as member of the Australo-Pacific honeyeaters (Meliphagidae). Lionel Walter Rothschild named it after Charles Reed Bishop, the founder of the Bishop Museum.

Description
 
It was discovered in 1892 by Henry C. Palmer, a bird collector for Lord Rothschild. Its length was about 29 centimeters. The tail had reached a length of 10 centimeters. The plumage was general glossy black with yellow feather tufts on the maxillaries, beneath the wings and the undertail coverts. Their songs were simple two notes, took-took, which could be heard for miles.

Distribution
It was endemic to the montane forests of the Hawaiian islands of Molokai, Maui, and Lanai. Subfossil bone finds from Maui (on Mount Olinda at about 4,500 ft above sea level) are sometimes referred to in literature as the Maui ʻōʻō.

Ecology
Little is known about its ecology. It fed on nectar from the flowers of Hawaiian lobelioids, much like other members of its family.

Extinction
Causes of the bird's extinction include deforestation, competition from introduced predators (such as the black rat), clearing of land for agriculture and livestock grazing, and diseases which were introduced by mosquitoes. It was last seen in 1904 by ornithologist George Campbell Munro. In 1915, Munro tried to verify reports of eventual sightings but he never found live individuals again.

Purported Maui Sightings
Reports of an O'o on Maui have been catalogued since 1828. In 1902, Henshaw reported seeing a bird matching the appearance of Bishop's O'o in the Olinda region. A spat of sightings of a bird with field marks and calls matching Bishop's O'o was reported in the 1980's from the Ko'olau Nature Reserve, most notably by Stephen R. Sabo in 1981. However, no specimen was ever captured or photographed in this region to confirm these reports. Subfossil remains of an O'o are known from Maui, so it is not implausible Bishop's O'o may have occurred here and evaded detection due to Maui being overlooked by 19th and 20th century collectors.

Specimens 
Today the bird can only be seen as specimens, paintings, picture notes, and skins. Records of these types are known to be held in Bremen, Cambridge, Massachusetts;. Honolulu; London; Molokai, Hawaiian Islands; New York; and Stockholm.

See also
 Mo-Ho-Bish-O-Pi - a Welsh indie rock group named in honor of the bird.

References

Further reading
Munro, George C. (1944 and its revised 2nd. edition from 1960): Birds of Hawaii
Flannery, Tim & Schouten, Peter (2001): A Gap in Nature
Fuller, Errol (2000): Extinct Birds
Day, David (1981): The Doomsday Book of Animals
Greenway, James C. (1967): Extinct and Vanishing Birds of the World
Luther, Dieter (2005): Die ausgestorbenen Vögel der Welt

External links
Fact Sheets Bishops Oo
Species factsheet - BirdLife International

Extinct birds of Hawaii
Endemic birds of Hawaii
Moho (genus)
Bird extinctions since 1500
Birds described in 1893
Taxa named by Walter Rothschild
Biota of Molokai